El Salvador first competed in the Olympic Games at the 1968 Summer Olympics in Mexico City, Mexico. It has participated in every Games of the Olympiad since that time, excluding those held in 1976 and 1980, when the nation joined the American-led boycott in protest of the Soviet invasion of Afghanistan. They have never competed in the Olympic Winter Games. El Salvador has not earned a medal at any Olympic Games.

Athletes from El Salvador have represented their nation in 13 sports. A total of 118 Salvadoran athletes have competed at the Olympic Games. Swimming (28 athletes) and athletics (27 athletes) have fetched the most participation from El Salvador.

The Comité Olímpico de El Salvador was created in 1925 and recognized by the International Olympic Committee in 1938.

Medal tables

Medals by Summer Games

Athletes by sport

Summer Olympics 

 The Total Athletes column indicates the number of athletes who have competed in each sport and is not intended to be a total of the athletes at each Olympic Games as some have participated in multiple Olympic Games.
 The Total Athletes row indicates the number of athletes who have competed at each Olympic Games.

Top finishes by sport

Summer Olympics

Summer Olympic Games

1968 Mexico City 

Though the International Olympic Committee recognized El Salvador's National Olympic Committee (Comité Olímpico de El Salvador) in 1938, the nation's first Olympic Games participation did not occur until the 1968 Summer Olympics in Mexico City, Mexico. The contingent of 60 athletes marked the largest in El Salvador's Olympic participation. Salvadorian athletes competed in seven sports (athletics, cycling, football, sailing, shooting, swimming, and weightlifting) but won no medals. Both the all-time youngest and oldest Olympic participants from El Salvador competed at these games. Swimmer Rubén Guerrero (13 years, 351 days) swam in five events: the Men's 400 meters Freestyle, 1,500 meters Freestyle, 4 × 100 meters Freestyle Relay, 100 meters Butterfly, and 200 meters Individual Medley. Roberto Soundy (68 years, 229 days) finished 54th in the Mixed Trap Shooting event. Swimmer Salvador Vilanova was selected to carry his nation's flag during the opening ceremony.

1972 Munich 

El Salvador's presence was much reduced when the nation sent only 11 athletes to the 1972 Summer Olympics in Munich, West Germany. These athletes competed in swimming and shooting events, marking the lowest number of contested sports in El Salvador's Olympic history. Swimmer Salvador Vilanova was once again selected to carry his nation's flag during the opening ceremony.

1984 Los Angeles 

No athletes were sent to the 1976 Summer Olympics, and El Salvador took part in the boycott of the 1980 Summer Olympics.

El Salvador returned to Olympic competition by sending ten athletes to participate in the 1984 Summer Olympics in Los Angeles, California, United States. El Salvador competed in athletics, judo, swimming, shooting, and wrestling. Long-distance runner Kriscia García was chosen to carry her nation's flag during the opening ceremony.

1988 Seoul 

Six athletes were sent to compete at the 1988 Summer Olympics in Seoul, South Korea. Salvadorian athletes competed in athletics, boxing, judo, and wrestling. Wrestler Gustavo Manzur was chosen to carry his nation's flag during the opening ceremony.

1992 Barcelona 

El Salvador sent its smallest-ever contingent of athletes to the 1992 Summer Olympics in Barcelona, Spain. Four athletes participated in athletics, judo, and swimming. Swimmer María José Marenco was selected to carry her nation's flag during the opening ceremony.

1996 Atlanta 

Eight Salvadorian athletes competed in the 1996 Summer Olympics in Atlanta, Georgia, United States. They competed in five events: athletics, judo, swimming, cycling, and weightlifting. Cyclist Maureen Kaila Vergara finished fifth, only six points off of the podium, in the first Women's Point Race to be contested at an Olympics. Judoka Juan Vargas was selected to carry his nation's flag during the opening ceremony.

2000 Sydney 

El Salvador sent eight athletes to the 2000 Summer Olympics in Sydney, Australia. They competed in seven sports: athletics, archery, cycling, judo, shooting, swimming, and weightlifting. Weightlifter Eva Dimas was chosen to carry her nation's flag during the opening ceremony.

2004 Athens 

Seven athletes were sent to represent El Salvador at the 2004 Summer Olympics in Athens, Greece. The athletes participated in seven sports: athletics, archery, cycling, shooting, swimming, and weightlifting. Cyclist Evelyn García was chosen to carry her nation's flag during the opening ceremony.

2008 Beijing 

El Salvador competed in more sports at the 2008 Summer Olympics in Beijing, China, than at any other games in their history. Eleven athletes competed in nine sports: athletics, cycling, judo, rowing, shooting, swimming, tennis, weightlifting, and wrestling. Pistol shooter Luisa Maida finished in eighth place in the Women's Sporting Pistol (25 meters), only 15.2 points away from medaling. Weightlifter Eva Dimas, who also carried the flag in 2000, was selected to carry her nation's flag during the opening ceremony.

2012 London 

Ten Salvadorian athletes were sent to represent their nation at the 2012 Summer Olympics in London, United Kingdom. The nation had representation in seven sports: athletics, rowing, swimming, cycling, judo, shooting, and weightlifting. Cyclist Evelyn García, who also carried the flag in 2004, was selected to carry her nation's flag during the opening ceremony.

See also
List of Salvadorian Olympians
List of flag bearers for El Salvador at the Olympics
El Salvador at the Paralympics

References

External links
 
 
 

 
Olympics